Erbil Sports Club is a sports club based in the city of Erbil, Iraqi Kurdistan that plays in the Iraqi Premier League, the first-tier of Iraqi football. The club is also known as "Yaney Hewlêr", the Kurdish name for Erbil.

For the first time in its history, Erbil became champions of the Iraqi Premier League after beating Al-Quwa Al-Jawiya (1–0) in the final game on Friday, 6 July 2007. On 24 August 2008, Erbil retained their status as Iraqi Premier League champions with a win over Baghdad based Al-Zawraa. On 16 July 2009 Erbil became the champion of Iraq's super league for the third consecutive year after beating Najaf FC. They also won the league in 2012 with only one loss.

Erbil Sport Club is the first Iraqi-Kurdish team to qualify for the Asian Champions League and the Arab Champions League. In 2012 and 2014 they reached the AFC Cup final but lost both times. Erbil SC is the first Iraqi Premier League team to get players from outside Iraq.

History

Foundation
Erbil SC was founded on 3 November 1968, by the former Kurdistan-Iraq Football Association and spent many years in mid-table obscurity, occasionally challenging the top Iraqi sides.

2004–2005
After the turn of the century and the beginning of the Iraq War, Erbil FC has dramatically improved and have become a real powerhouse in Iraqi club football. Top Iraqi players from southern Iraq and international players from around the world have begun coming to the kurdistan region and to Erbil SC to play their trade with good wages and relative safety.

Nadhim Shaker and glory years
In the summer of 2005, Shaker left rivals Duhok SC to coach Erbil. In the 2005–06 season, Erbil started slow, only just managing to finish third in Group A just ahead of Sirwan FC on goal difference to advance to the second round. Erbil topped their group in the second round to advance to the end of season play-offs where they met southern giants Najaf FC in a two-legged home and away tie. Erbil were beaten by Najaf by a 4–1 scoreline which basically dented all hope of reaching the play-off final for the title. In the home leg, Erbil were winning 1–0 when the match got suspended with a replay taking place five days later with the match resulting in a 1–1 scoreline. This meant Erbil were knocked out of a chance of winning the championship but would instead take part in the third-place play-off match. This match didn't take place as in the other semi-final match between the two Baghdad giants, Al-Quwa Al-Jawiya and Al-Zawra'a. The second match of the leg was cancelled as the Al-Quwa players walked off the pitch, resulting in their disqualification and Erbil getting the automatic third-place finish. All in all, it was a strong first season under Shaker and that summer the team improved personnel ready for the next season.

Franso Hariri Stadium
Franso Hariri Stadium is the stadium where Erbil Sport Club play their home games. It is a multi-use stadium in Erbil. The stadium holds 25,000. It was built in 1992.

After the assassination of Franso Heriri on 18 February 2001, who actively supported rebuilding the stadium, the Kurdistan Regional Government renamed it in his memory.

In July 2009, Franso Hariri Stadium became Iraq national football team's home venue after the green-light from AFC to host the Iraqi national and clubs teams in Erbil. However, due to technical problems, FIFA abandoned the idea of having more national games being hosted in the stadium.

Rivalries
Erbil SC's main rival is Duhok SC with whom they contest the South Kurdistan derby. Also, the rivalry between Erbil SC  and Zakho SC is known as the "Kurdish derby".

Honours

Performance in AFC competitions
AFC Champions League: 1 appearance
2008: Group Stage

AFC Cup: 6 appearances
2009: Quarter-finals
2011: Semi-finals
2012: Runners-up
2013: Round of 16
2014: Runners-up
2015: Group Stage

Individual honours
2009 FIFA Confederations Cup
The following players have played in the FIFA Confederations Cup whilst playing for Erbil:
 2009 – Luay Salah

Current squad

First-team squad

Out on loan

Recent history

From 2004 to 2005 season, the competition changed from League system to various rounds including table and knockout rounds.
From 2011 to 2012 season, the competition went back to the single league system.
From 2014 to 2015 season, the competition returned to a system with various rounds.
From 2016 to 2017 season, the competition went back to the single league system.

Managerial history

Nationality is indicated by the corresponding FIFA country code(s).

Current technical staff

{| class="toccolours"
!bgcolor=silver|Position
!bgcolor=silver|Name
!bgcolor=silver|Nationality
|- bgcolor=#eeeeee
|Manager:||Nizar Mahrous||
|- 
|- bgcolor=#eeeeee
|Assistant manager:||Saeed Sweidan||
|- 
|Assistant manager:||Ahmed Mnajed||
|- 
|Goalkeeping coach:||Samir Rihani||
|-bgcolor=#eeeeee
| Fitness coach:||Vacant||
|- 
| Administrative director:||Haider Hammed||
|-
|U-16 Manager:||Emad Asaad||
|-

See also
Iraqi clubs in the AFC Cup
Iraqi clubs in the AFC Champions League

References

External links
Official Logo (archived)
Official Site – archived 
Club squad on the AFC official website

Erbil
1968 establishments in Iraq
Association football clubs established in 1968
Football clubs in Erbil